Garry Watson (born 7 October 1955) is an English retired professional footballer who played as a left back.

Career
Born in Bradford, Watson played for Bradford City, Doncaster Rovers, Halifax Town and Whitby Town.

He signed for Bradford City in November 1970 after playing local amateur football. He made a total of 293 appearances for the club, scoring 30 goals - 28 goals in 263 league appearances, no goals in 10 FA Cup appearances, and 2 goals in 20 League Cup appearances. He signed on loan for Doncaster Rovers in October 1982, and played for Halifax Town between July 1984 and May 1985.

After a spell managing non-league club Guiseley, in October 2013 he was running a carpet fitting business in Eccleshill, Bradford.

Sources

References

1955 births
Living people
English footballers
Bradford City A.F.C. players
Doncaster Rovers F.C. players
Halifax Town A.F.C. players
Whitby Town F.C. players
English Football League players
Footballers from Bradford
Association football fullbacks
English football managers
Guiseley A.F.C. managers